Streptomyces tacrolimicus is a bacterium species from the genus of Streptomyces which has been isolated from deer dung. Streptomyces tacrolimicus produces tacrolimus.

See also 
 List of Streptomyces species

References

Further reading

External links
Type strain of Streptomyces tacrolimicus at BacDive -  the Bacterial Diversity Metadatabase

tacrolimicus
Bacteria described in 2011